Theodore William Connolly (December 5, 1931  February 24, 2014) was a professional American football player for the San Francisco 49ers from 1954 to 1962 and Cleveland Browns in 1963.

He earned all-Pro honors and was a member of the 1962 NFL All-Star team as named by The Sporting News.

He originally played in college at Santa Clara University and was an All-American until they dropped football in 1951.  He moved on to the University of Tulsa where he graduated in 1953.

He died at his home in Gardnerville, Nevada on February 24, 2014, from acute myelocytic leukemia.

References

1931 births
2014 deaths
Players of American football from Oakland, California
American football offensive guards
Tulsa Golden Hurricane football players
San Francisco 49ers players
Cleveland Browns players
Western Conference Pro Bowl players
People from Gardnerville, Nevada